The 1995 Skate America was the first event of five in the 1995–96 ISU Champions Series, a senior-level international invitational competition series. It was held at the Cobo Arena in Detroit, Michigan on October 17–22. Medals were awarded in the disciplines of men's singles, ladies' singles, pair skating, and ice dancing. Skaters earned points towards qualifying for the 1995–96 Champions Series Final.

Results

Men

Ladies
Michelle Kwan rose to first after placing third in the short program. Bobek missed all five of her triple jumps.

Pairs

Ice dancing

References

External links
 1995–96 Champions Series results

Skate America, 1995
Skate America
Skate America